

Middle Ages
15 August 1219: Autocephaly of the Serbian Church (Archbishopric).
January 1235: Death of Saint Sava.
1253: Seat moved from Žiča to Peć.
16 April 1346: Elevation to Patriarchate.
1463: de facto abolishment of Serbian Church, under Ecumenical Patriarchate.

Early Modern period
1557: Restoration of autocephaly.
1594: Burning of St. Sava's relics.
1691: Establishment of the Metropolitanate of Karlovci
1766: Abolishment of the Patriarchate by the Ottoman government.
1766: Establishment of the Metropolitanate of Belgrade.

Modern period
1848: Elevation to Patriarchate of Karlovci.
1879: Official autocephaly in Serbia after international recognition.
1920: Unification of the Serbian Orthodox Church (Serbian Patriarchate).
1945–80s: Suppression of Church by Communist regime.
1967: Unilateral establishment of the Macedonian Orthodox Church.
1993: Uncanonical establishment of the Montenegrin Orthodox Church.

Serbian Orthodox Church
Serbian history timelines